The Philosophy of Modern Song is a book by American singer-songwriter Bob Dylan, published on November 1, 2022, by Simon & Schuster. The book contains Dylan's commentary on 66 songs by other artists. It is the first book Dylan has published since he was awarded the Nobel Prize in Literature.

Summary 
The Philosophy of Modern Song consists of 66 short essays on popular songs, the earliest of which is Uncle Dave Macon's 1924 recording of "Keep My Skillet Good and Greasy" and the most recent of which is Alvin Youngblood Hart's 2004 recording of Stephen Foster's "Nelly Was a Lady". Most of the chapters are divided into two parts, a poetic introductory segment in which Dylan uses a second-person point-of-view to inhabit the narrator of the song (what Simon & Schuster referred to as "dreamlike riffs" in pre-release publicity) followed by a more conventionally written essay portion.

Chapters

Release and promotion 
The book's publication was announced on March 8, 2022. According to Simon & Schuster, Dylan had begun working on the book in 2010. 

Prior to its release, on October 13, 2022, excerpts from the book (from the chapters on "My Generation" and "Strangers in the Night") appeared in the New York Times. The hardcover edition of The Philosophy of Modern Song was published on November 1, 2022. To promote the book, Dylan only consented to one interview, which appeared in the Wall Street Journal on December 19, 2022. In a discussion with critic and musician Jeff Slate, Dylan talked about songwriting, streaming music technology, life during the COVID-19 pandemic-induced lockdown and why the book included a thank you to the "crew at Dunkin' Donuts" ("because they were compassionate, supportive and they went the extra mile"). Later that same day, an extended version of the interview appeared on Dylan's official website.

Reception 
According to the book review aggregator Book Marks, the book was received positively, based on 36 reviews.

Neil McCormick of The Daily Telegraph awarded the book a full five stars, and described it as "an excuse for the great man to write with joyful zest, piercing profundity and flamboyant imagination about whatever crosses his mind". David Remnick, writing in The New Yorker, praised it as "a rich, riffy, funny, and completely engaging book of essays". The book was described as "absolutely one of the best books about popular music ever written" by Chris Willman in Variety. Rolling Stone included it in a list of the "best music books of 2022". The Chicago Tribune named it one of the "10 best books of 2022" and the Sydney Morning Herald named it one of 10 books that "made their mark in 2022". The Buffalo News cited it as "one of the great books...of the past decade".

Jody Rosen of the LA Times and Ludovic Hunter-Tilney of The Financial Times both noted that only four of the songs included were by women, which they interpreted as a "misogynist" oversight on the part of the author. Anne Margaret Daniel, writing in The Spectator, however, cautioned against looking at Dylan's choice of songs as representing any sort of canon or even list of "favorites", noting that Dylan actually seems to "dislike" some of the selections (e.g., Bing Crosby's "The Whiffenpoof Song" and the Eagles' "Witchy Woman"). Daniel noted that Dylan appears to be using this particular set of songs "to illustrate points, to instruct and to entertain, not to...tell us what he likes best".

Author and Xavier University English Professor Graley Herren wrote an essay arguing that Dylan's commentary on Bing Crosby's "The Whiffenpoof Song" is actually a veiled critique of Yale University's secretive Skull and Bones society. Herren sees this critique as being in subtextual dialogue with the book's chapters on Edwin Starr's "War" and John Trudell's "Doesn't Hurt Anymore".

The book debuted at number three on The New York Times nonfiction best-seller list for the week ending November 5, 2022. It spent 10 consecutive weeks on the list.

Images
The book features hundreds of photographs and illustrations, licensed from many different sources, the overall design of which is credited to Coco Shinomiya (who also designed several of Dylan's 21st century albums). When asked to discuss the "significance" of the images by Jeff Slate, Dylan responded, "They’re running mates to the text, involved in the same way, share the same outcome. They portray ideas and associations that you might not notice otherwise, visual interaction". Anne Margaret Daniel wrote that the illustrations "deserve both mention and praise. They are copious, and they comment on, enrich and complicate every song". Daniel cites a film still of Richard Burton and Elizabeth Taylor from Who's Afraid of Virginia Woolf? used to illustrate the divorce song "Cheaper to Keep Her" as "the perfect gimme" while noting that her favorites are the images of a flat sea, a whale hunt gone wrong and a still of Burt Lancaster and Deborah Kerr kissing on the beach in From Here to Eternity, which more obliquely comment on Bobby Darin's "Beyond the Sea".

Audiobook 
An audiobook version of The Philosophy of Modern Song was released concurrently with the book. The audiobook was narrated by Dylan, with actors Jeff Bridges, Oscar Isaac, Rita Moreno, Jeffrey Wright, Sissy Spacek, John Goodman, Alfre Woodard, Steve Buscemi, Helen Mirren, and Renée Zellweger as guest narrators. 

Audiophile Magazine referred to Dylan's narration as "raspy and compelling" and wrote of the all-star cast: "Almost as one voice, the narrators create a flow of energy that adds immeasurably to the impact of Dylan’s poetic writing".

Autograph controversy
900 limited edition hand-signed autograph versions of the book were offered for sale online through Simon & Schuster for a price of $599 in the U.S. but it was soon discovered that they were not actually hand-signed by Dylan. The books in question appeared to be machine signed by an autopen or signing device, using at least 17 different signature variations. The publisher apologized in a tweet and provided refunds.

References 

2022 non-fiction books
Books by Bob Dylan
Simon & Schuster books
Music books